The Greek Archaeological Service is a state service, under the auspices of the Greek Ministry of Culture, responsible for the oversight of all archaeological excavations, museums and the country's archaeological heritage in general.

It is the oldest such service in Europe, being founded in 1833, immediately after the establishment of the modern Greek state.

Officers of the Archaeological Service are known as ephors.

Notable members 
Semni Karouzou
Venetia Kotta

See also
 List of museums in Greece
 Central Archaeological Council
 Archaeological Society of Athens
 Ephorate of Underwater Antiquities

References

Sources

External links 
 The Historical Archive of the Archaeological Service

Archaeology of Greece
National archaeological organizations
1833 establishments in Greece
Archaeological
Government agencies established in the 1830s